Avondale is one of Chicago's 77 officially designated community areas. It is on the Northwest Side of the city. The northern border is Addison Street from the north branch of the Chicago River in the east to Pulaski Road in the west. The neighborhood extends further west along Belmont Avenue to the Union Pacific/Northwest Line. Its southern border is Diversey Avenue from the Union Pacific/Northwest Line to the Chicago River.

History
The first European settler in Avondale was Abraham Harris who settled the area three years after its 1850 incorporation into Jefferson Township. In 1869, Avondale was incorporated as a village. It has been speculated that developer and Pennsylvania native John Lewis Cochran named the village in honor of the miners and rescue workers who died in the Avondale coal mine fire. Atypical for the time, Avondale was racially integrated in the nineteenth century with twenty African American families moving to the area and building Avondale's first church in the 1880s. Avondale, along with the rest of Jefferson Township, was annexed by the City of Chicago in 1889.

Factories and other industries sprang up around the start of the 20th century due to the Chicago River and Avondale's dense network of transportation corridors that were built in the 1870s and improved after its annexation into Chicago including replacement of cable cars with electric powered streetcars. The resulting jobs in the area were responsible for drawing the initial wave of European immigrants.

Avondale was the site of one of Chicago's "Seven Lost Wonders", the Olson Park and Waterfall complex at Diversey and Pulaski.

Beginning in the 1980s, Latino settlement began in Avondale. A multiplicity of other diverse Eastern European ethnicities came to the area following the End of Communism in 1989, leading to Avondale's nickname as the neighborhood "Where Eastern Europe meets Latin America".

Starting in the mid-2000s, gentrification began to take hold in the Avondale area as it had in neighboring Wicker Park, Logan Square and Bucktown.

Demographics

Avondale has traditionally had a large Polish population, with patches of German, Scandinavian, and Italians settlement as well. In recent years this blue-collar neighborhood has witnessed an increase in its social diversity. The collapse of Communism in Eastern Europe witnessed an influx of Eastern European immigrants such as Czechs, Slovaks, Ukrainians and Belarusians, particularly alongside Poles in the "Polish Village". The emigration of peoples from the Soviet Bloc in Avondale since then has grown to include Russophone nationals from Central Asia and even Mongolia.  A strong Filipino community is present in Avondale as well, which is home to Chicago's Filipino TV outlet. Latino settlement beginning in the 1980s led to an increase in Avondale's Hispanic population from 37.6% in 1990 to 62.0% in 2000, with increased numbers of Mexicans, Puerto Ricans, and Central American immigrants. Because of gentrification, the last decade has seen a reversal of this trend, as the non-Hispanic white population has been expanding faster than the Hispanic population.

Transportation
Avondale is served by the 'L' at two stations along the Blue Line. The  station is on the northeastern edge next to the Kennedy Expressway at the intersection of Kimball Avenue and Belmont, less than three blocks away from St. Hyacinth's former mission of Our Lady of Lourdes; the  station is located in the median of the same expressway adjacent to the neighboring Villa District.

Avondale is also accessible by a number of bus routes run by the CTA.
Running Northwest/ Southeast:
56 Milwaukee
Running North/ South:
49 Western
52 Kedzie/California
53 Pulaski
82 Kimball-Homan
Running East/ West:
76 Diversey
77 Belmont
152 Addison

Neighborhoods

Polish Village

The Polish Village or Jackowo  and Wacławowo , together make up one of Chicago's largest and most vibrant Polish Patches. The neighborhoods derive their Polish names from the two contiguous Polish Roman Catholic parishes- Saint Hyacinth's Basilica (Bazylika Św. Jacka) and St. Wenceslaus Church (Kościół Świętego Wacława). Milwaukee Avenue is the district's main commercial strip, which includes a number of sausage shops, restaurants, and bakeries.  In English the area is usually referred to as the Polish Village - the name featured on signs hung on street lamps over the district. Pulaski Avenue, named after the Polish Revolutionary War hero, runs through the area.

The Polish communities of Jackowo and Wacławowo appeared in the late 19th and early 20th centuries as Polish settlement spread further northwest along Milwaukee Avenue. The neighborhood experienced its heyday as the cultural nexus of Chicago's Polonia during the 1980s and 1990s with the so-called Solidarity and Post-Solidarity waves of Polish migration to Chicago, including a number of political refugees. Until the recent installation of an automated system, on Sunday mornings the CTA driver would announce "Yats- koh- voh", signaling the stop for St. Hyacinth Basilica as Poles shuttled off the bus on their way to Mass. Local landmarks and institutions increasingly became revitalized and renewed while taking on an increasingly ethnic hue by catering to these recent arrivals from Poland. The historic Milford Theatre  served as the central Polish cinema arts venue like Jefferson Park's Gateway Theater today, with locals giving it the nickname "Cinema Polski", drawing even street photographer Vivian Maier.

A distinct flowering of Polish arts and culture took place here in Avondale, an environment where Poles could finally freely express themselves without worrying about incurring the wrath of government censors or political repression. The events and activities organized here by Chicago's Polish community played a key role in shaping the chain of events that eventually resulted in the collapse of the Communist government in Poland, bringing down the Iron Curtain that had divided Europe since after World War II. An expressive and now decaying mural in the McDonald's parking lot combining Polish patriotic and folkloric motifs by Caryl Yasko titled "Razem", or together in Polish, was painted thanks in part to funds furnished by the Polish American Congress in 1975. It now stands near the corners of Belmont and Pulaski in mute testament to this bygone renaissance.

Just to the north of Jackowo is Wacławowo and the parish of St. Wenceslaus, with its impressive church. Housing stock there primarily consists of brick two-flats built in the first half of the 20th century prior to World War II, although there are a number of bungalows present in the area neighboring the Villa District to the north.

Belmont Gardens
Belmont Gardens spans the Chicago Community Areas of Logan Square and Avondale like neighboring Kosciuszko Park, located within its northwest portion, where the Pulaski Industrial Corridor abuts these residential areas. The boundaries of Belmont Gardens are generally held to be Pulaski Road to the East, the Union Pacific/Northwest rail line to the West, Belmont Avenue to the North, and Fullerton Avenue to the South.

Most of the land between Fullerton Avenue and Diversey Avenue as well as Kimball Avenue to the Union Pacific/Northwest rail line was empty as late as the 1880s, mostly consisting of the rural "truck farms" that peppered much of Jefferson Township. This began to change with the annexation of this rustic hinterland to the city in 1889 in anticipation of the World's Columbian Exposition that would focus the country's eyes on Chicago just a few years later in 1893.

Belmont Gardens's first urban development began thanks to Homer Pennock, who founded the industrial village of Pennock, Illinois. Centered on Wrightwood Avenue, which was originally laid out as "Pennock Boulevard", was planned to be a hefty industrial and residential district. The development was so renowned that the village was highlighted in a "History of Cook County, Illinois" authored by Weston Arthur Goodspeed and Daniel David Healy. Thwarted by circumstances as well as the decline of Homer Pennock's fortune, this district declined to the point that the Chicago Tribune wrote about the neighborhood in an article titled "A Deserted Village in Chicago" in 1903. The original name of the Healy Metra Station was originally named after this now lost settlement.

While Homer Pennock's industrial suburb failed, Chicago's rapid expansion transformed the area's farms into clusters of factories and homes. At the start of the 20th century as settlement was booming, Belmont Gardens and Avondale were at the Northwestern edge of the Milwaukee Avenue "Polish Corridor"- a contiguous stretch of Polish settlement which spanned this thoroughfare all the way from Polonia Triangle at Milwaukee, Division and Ashland to Irving Park Road.

Belmont Gardens offered more than just a less congested setting for its new residents. Due to its proximity to rail along the Chicago, Milwaukee, St. Paul and Pacific Railroad, the area developed a plethora of industry that still survives in the city's Pulaski Industrial Corridor. It was adjacent to his own factory that Mr. Walter E. Olson built what the Chicago Tribune put at the top of its list of the "Seven Lost Wonders of Chicago", the Olson Park and Waterfall Complex, a 22-acre garden and waterfall remembered by Chicagoans citywide as the place they fondly reminisce heading out to for family trips on the weekend. The ambitious project took 200 workers more than six months to fashion it out of 800 tons of stone and 800 yards of soil.

Latino settlement in the neighborhood began in the 1980s. Today the area still retains its blue collar feel as much of surrounding Logan Square and Avondale undergo increased gentrification.

Kosciuszko Park

Kosciuszko Park spans the Chicago Community Areas of Logan Square and Avondale like neighboring Belmont Gardens, located within its northwest portion, where the Pulaski Industrial Corridor abuts these residential areas. Colloquially known by locals as "Koz Park", or even the "Land of Koz", the area is a prime example of a local identity born thanks to the green spaces created by Chicago's civic leaders of the Progressive Era.

The boundaries of Kosciuszko Park are generally held to be Central Park Avenue to the East, Pulaski Road to the West, George Street to the North, and Altgeld to the South.

Most of the land between Fullerton Avenue and Diversey Avenue as well as Kimball Avenue to Pulaski Road was empty as late as the 1880s, mostly consisting of the rural "truck farms" that peppered much of Jefferson Township. This began to change with the annexation of this rustic hinterland to the city in 1889 in anticipation of the World's Columbian Exposition that would focus the country's eyes on Chicago just a few years later in 1893.

Kosciuszko Park's first urban development began thanks to Homer Pennock, who founded the industrial village of Pennock, Illinois. Centered on Wrightwood Avenue, which was originally laid out as "Pennock Boulevard", was planned to be a hefty industrial and residential district. The development was so renowned that the village was highlighted in a "History of Cook County, Illinois" authored by Weston Arthur Goodspeed and Daniel David Healy. Thwarted by circumstances as well as the decline of Homer Pennock's fortune, this district declined to the point that the Chicago Tribune wrote about the neighborhood in an article titled "A Deserted Village in Chicago" in 1903.

While Homer Pennock's industrial suburb failed, Chicago's rapid expansion transformed the area's farms into clusters of factories and homes. At the start of the 20th century as settlement was booming, Kosciuszko Park and Avondale were at the Northwestern edge of the Milwaukee Avenue "Polish Corridor"- a contiguous stretch of Polish settlement which spanned this thoroughfare all the way from Polonia Triangle at Milwaukee, Division and Ashland to Irving Park Road.

Kosciuszko Park offered more than just a less congested setting for its new residents. Due to its proximity to rail along the Chicago, Milwaukee, St. Paul and Pacific Railroad, the area developed a plethora of industry that still survives in the city's Pulaski Industrial Corridor.

Adjacent to Kosciuszko Park's border with Avondale proper near the intersection of George Street and Lawndale Avenue is St. Hyacinth Basilica, which began in 1894 as a refuge for locals to tend to their spiritual needs. A local shrine, St. Hyacinth's features relics associated with Pope John Paul II, as well as an icon with an ornate jeweled crown that was blessed by the late pontiff. Other institutions further enriched the institutional fabric of the Polish community in the area. In 1897, the Polish Franciscan Sisters began building an expansive complex on Schubert and Hamlin Avenues with the construction of St. Joseph Home for the Aged and Crippled, a structure that would also serve as the motherhouse for the order. When it opened in 1898, it became the city's first and oldest Catholic nursing home. One of the industries the nuns took upon themselves to support these charitable activities was a church vestment workshop which opened in 1909 on the second floor. In 1928 the Franciscan Sisters further expanded the complex by building a new St. Joseph Home of Chicago, a structure that stood until recently at 2650 North Ridgeway. Designed by the distinguished firm of Slupkowski and Piontek who built many of the most prestigious commissions in Chicago's Polish community such as the Art Deco headquarters of the Polish National Alliance and Holy Trinity High School among others, the brick structure was an imposing edifice. One of the building's highlights was a chapel with an altar that was dedicated to the Black Madonna. The entire complex was sold to a developer who subsequently razed the entire complex, while the new "St. Joseph Village" opened in 2005 on the site of the former Madonna High School and now operates at 4021 W. Belmont Avenue. The park later became home to one of the two first Polish language Saturday schools in Chicago. While the school has since moved out of their small quarters at the park fieldhouse, the Tadeusz Kościuszko School of Polish Language continues to educate over 1,000 students to the present day, reminding all of its origins in Kosciuszko Park with its name.

It was the park of Kosciuszko Park however that weaved together the disparate subdivisions and people into one community. Dedicated in 1916, Kosciuszko Park owes its name to the Polish patriot Tadeusz Kosciuszko. Best known as the designer and builder of West Point, Kosciuszko fought in the American Revolution and was awarded with U.S. citizenship and the rank of brigadier general as a reward. Kosciuszko was one of the original parks of the Northwest Park District which was established in 1911. One of the ambitious goals of the Northwest Park District that was in keeping with the spirit of the Progressive Movement popular at the time was to provide one park for each of the ten square miles under its jurisdiction. Beginning in 1914, the district began to purchase land for what would eventually become Mozart, Kelyvn, and Kosciuszko Parks, and improvement on these three sites began almost immediately. For Kosciuszko, noted architect Albert A. Schwartz designed a Tudor revival-style fieldhouse, expanded in 1936 to include an assembly hall, just two years after the 22 separate park districts were consolidated into the Chicago Park District. The park complex expanded during the 1980s with the addition of a new natatorium at the corner of Diversey and Avers.

The green space afforded by the park quickly became the backdrop for community gatherings. Residents utilized the grounds at Kosciuszko Park for bonfires, festivals and neighborhood celebrations, and for a time, even an ice skating rink that would be set up every winter. Summertime brought the opportunity for outdoor festivities, peppered with sports and amateur shows featuring softball games, social dancing, a music appreciation hour, and the occasional visit by the city's "mobile zoo".

Today "The Land of Koz" is a diverse neighborhood, and becoming even more so as gentrification advances further northwest. New people are entering Kosciuszko Park and joining earlier residents whose roots trace back to Latin America and Poland. Yet the park that lent the neighborhood its name still serves its residents, where through play, performance, and even the occasional outdoor film screening it functions as the venue where the community can come together.

Economy
In 1937, Dad's Root Beer was founded in Avondale by Ely Klapman and Barney Berns. The company operated a bottling plant in the community before the company moved operations. The factory has since been converted into condominiums.

As of 2014, the top 5 employing industry sectors in Avondale are retail trade (20.9%), manufacturing (14.8%), utilities (12.4%), accommodation and food service (9.8%), and finance (7.4%). Over half of these workers come from outside of Chicago and 45.5% come from outside of Avondale within the city. The top 5 employing industry sectors of community residents are accommodation and food service (11.5%), healthcare (11%), professional (10.1%), retail trade (9.6%), and administration (8.3%).

Education
Avondale residents are served by Chicago Public Schools, which includes neighborhood and citywide options for students. There are also a number of private parochial schools run by Roman Catholic congregations in the area.

Carl Von Linne School, 3221 N. Sacramento, on Sacramento between Belmont and School is a neighborhood school.  The school features a comprehensive gifted program and a dual language program.  There is an emphasis on fine arts including visual arts, ceramic, music, dance, digital arts, and culinary arts.  The school has a "sprouting teens garden" on the east side of the building and a "kitchen community culinary garden" in the main playground.

The United Neighborhood Organization operates the Carlos Fuentes School in Avondale.

Public libraries
The Chicago Public Library operates no branches located in the Avondale community area. Although the branch in nearby Kosciuszko Park was one of the system's most utilized branches, it was closed by the 1950s. Branches are available nearby in adjacent neighborhoods, such as Logan Square, Irving Park, and Belmont Cragin.

Politics
The Avondale community area has supported the Democratic Party in the past two presidential elections. In the 2016 presidential election, Avondale cast 10,290 votes for Hillary Clinton and cast 1,345 votes for Donald Trump (83.77% to 10.95%). In the 2012 presidential election, Avondale cast 7,940 votes for Barack Obama and 1,415 votes for Mitt Romney (82.43% to 14.69%).

Parks
Avondale was cited by the Chicago Tribune as being in the top tier of Chicago's "park poor" neighborhoods. This situation was further aggravated when Avondale Park was reduced to just over one acre in size during the building of the Kennedy Expressway, taking over most of its green space, including the park's playfield, separate boys' and girls' playgrounds, a wading pool, a sand box and tennis courts while leaving the fieldhouse designed by Clarence Hatzfeld intact.

The substantial green spaces in the Avondale community area are Brands Park, followed by Avondale Park. Parks adjacent to Avondale such as Kosciuszko Park, Athletic Field Park and Ken-Well Park are heavily utilized by residents as well. Additionally, there are playlots under the supervision of other parks such as Grape Playlot, Park-view Playlot, Nelson Playlot, Elston Playlot, and Sacramento Playlot, found within Avondale.

Culture
Avondale has a number of strong and simultaneously diverse cultural centers. St. Hyacinth Basilica continues to be a strong cultural and civic institution for Chicago's Polish Community. True to stereotype, the neighborhood "where Eastern Europe meets Latin America" is also home to the new second location of the Puerto Rican Arts Alliance in the former firehouse of Engine 91. The Hairpin Arts Center is located in Avondale near its border with Logan Square at the gateway to Chicago's Polish Village, serving all of the diverse communities who make their home in these neighborhoods.

Coolness
Time Out in October 2022 released its list of the "51 Coolest Neighborhoods in the World." It ranked Avondale 16th on that list.

Notable people

 Vivian Maier, photographer who achieved posthumous fame. A resident of various neighborhoods including Rogers Park, she took photos in Chicago's Polish Village.
 Lucy Parsons, labor organizer and founder of Industrial Workers of the World. She perished in a fire in Avondale in 1942.
 Carlos Ramirez-Rosa, member of the Chicago City Council representing the 26th ward and the first openly gay, Latino alderman. He is a resident of Avondale.
 Louise Schaaf (1906-2020), supercentenarian notable for being, at the time of her death, the oldest person in Illinois and the oldest known person born in Germany. She resided near Belmont and California in Avondale until 1959 when she moved to the Norwood Park neighborhood.

See also

 Polish Cathedral style
 Polish American

References

External links 
 Official City of Chicago Avondale Community Map
 Avondale, Chicago Webliography
 The History of Avondale and Chicago's Polish Village
 Holiday in Avondale, Forgotten Chicago's take on Avondale
 Avondale and Chicago's Polish Village in the newsletter of the Northwest Chicago Historical Society 
 Avondale Neighborhood Association

Community areas of Chicago
North Side, Chicago
Polish-American culture in Chicago
Ethnic enclaves in Illinois
Polish communities in the United States